Noël Audet (December 23, 1938 – December 29, 2005) was a Canadian novelist and poet from Quebec. He is most noted as a two-time nominee for the Governor General's Award for French-language fiction, receiving nominations at the 1981 Governor General's Awards for Ah, l'amour l'amour, and at the 1988 Governor General's Awards for L'Ombre de l'épervier.

Born in Maria, Quebec, he published two books of poetry in the 1960s before publishing his debut short story collection Quand la voile faseille in 1980. L'Ombre de l'épervier, his most successful novel, was published in 1988 and was adapted into a television series for Télévision de Radio-Canada in 1998.

Le Roi des planeurs, the final novel published before Audet's death, was released in 2005. One further novel, Entre la boussole et l'étoile, was published posthumously in 2006.

In addition to his writing, Audet was a longtime professor at the Université du Québec à Montréal.

Works
 1963: Figures parallèles
 1968: La Tête barbare
 1968: Quand la voile faseille
 1981: Ah, l'amour l'amour
 1984: Dix nouvelles humoristiques
 1984: La Parade
 1987: Ah, l'amour l'amour
 1988: Premier Amour
 1988: L'Ombre de l'épervier
 1989: Rencontres/encuentros
 1990: Écrire de la fiction au Québec
 1991: Une douzaine de treize, superstitions gaspésiennes
 1992: Nouvelles de Montréal
 1992: L'Eau blanche
 1995: Frontières ou Tableaux d'Amérique
 1996: Xylon deux
 1998: La Terre promise
 2000: Récits de la fête
 2000: La Maison du rêve
 2002: Les Bonheurs d'un héros incertain
 2002: Ce qu'il nous reste de liberté
 2005: Le Roi des planeurs
 2006: Entre la boussole et l'étoile

References

1938 births
2005 deaths
20th-century Canadian male writers
20th-century Canadian novelists
20th-century Canadian poets
21st-century Canadian male writers
21st-century Canadian novelists
21st-century Canadian poets
Canadian male novelists
Canadian male poets
Canadian novelists in French
Canadian poets in French
French Quebecers
People from Maria, Quebec
Writers from Quebec
Academic staff of the Université du Québec à Montréal
Université Laval alumni